The Ultra SkyMarathon Madeira is an international skyrunning competition held for the first time in 2014. It runs every year in Madeira (Portugal) in July. The race is valid for the Skyrunner World Series.

Races
 Ultra SkyMarathon Madeira, an Ultra SkyMarathon (55.6 km / 5,121 m elevation)
 Santana Sky Race, a SkyRace (23 km / 1,672 m elevation)
 Quinta do Furão Mini Sky Race, a mini SkyRace (13 km / 655 m elevation)
 Santana Vertical Kilometer, a Vertical Kilometer (4.8 km / 1,003 m elevation)

Ultra SkyMarathon Madeira

See also 
 Skyrunner World Series

References

External links 
 Official web site

Skyrunning competitions
Skyrunner World Series
Athletics competitions in Portugal
Sport in Madeira